The 1994–95 Scottish Premier Division season began on 13 August 1994; it was the first season of the new ten team league format, and also the first season using the rule of awarding three points for a win.

Overview
The 1994–95 Scottish Premier Division season ended in success for Rangers who won the title by fifteen points from nearest rivals Motherwell to clinch seven titles in a row. Dundee United were relegated to the First Division after finishing bottom with Aberdeen surviving a relegation playoff against Dunfermline Athletic. As champions, Rangers qualified for the Champions League while Motherwell were joined by League Cup winners Raith Rovers in qualifying for the UEFA Cup. Fourth-placed Celtic qualified for the Cup Winners' Cup as Scottish Cup winners.

The season began on 13 August with the first goal of the season scored by Hibernian's Billy Findlay as they won 5–0 at home to Dundee United. The regular league season ended on 13 May, with the relegation/promotion play-off following on the 21st and 25th.

Clubs

Promotion and relegation from 1993–94
Promoted from First Division to Premier League
Falkirk

Relegated from Premier Division to First Division
St Johnstone
Raith Rovers
Dundee

Stadia and locations

Managers

Managerial changes

League table

Results

Matches 1–18
During matches 1-18 each team plays every other team twice (home and away).

Matches 19–36
During matches 19-36 each team plays every other team a further two times (home and away).

Play-off
A two leg play-off took place between the 9th placed team in the Premier Division (Aberdeen) and the runner-up of the First Division (Dunfermline Athletic). Aberdeen won both legs by 3 goals to 1, winning the tie 6–2 on aggregate, thus securing their place in the 1995–96 Scottish Premier Division.

Top scorers

Source:=https://www.rsssf.org/tabless/scot95.html RSSSF

References

See also
 1994–95 in Scottish football
 1994–95 Dundee United F.C. season
 1994–95 Rangers F.C. season
Nine in a row

Scottish Premier Division seasons
Scot
1994–95 Scottish Football League